Aloe lukeana, or  Luke's aloe, is a solitary species of aloe plant with a  stem topped by a  rosette with multiple (20 to 30)  by up to  wide, recurving, and channeled dark green leaves with large evenly spaced light colored teeth. Aloe lukeana comes from Mount Morungole near the borders of South Sudan and Kenya in the Karamoja region of Uganda. The species was first formally described by Thomas Cole in 2015. Named after and dedicated to Thomas Cole's brother Luke Cole who was killed in a traffic accident in Uganda in 2009.

External links
Aloe lukeana at Plants of the World Online
Aloe lukeana San Marcos Growers
Aloe lukeana The National Gardening Association

References

 

lukeana